Merlin Book 2: The Seven Songs is a work of literature by T. A. Barron, published by Penguin.  The Seven Songs is the second book in a 12-book series known as The Merlin Saga. This book was originally published as The Seven Songs of Merlin, book two of The Lost Years of Merlin epic, a 5-book series.  These books chronicle the childhood of Merlin.

Plot summary 
Young Merlin has brought new hope to Fincayra, the enchanted isle that lies between earth and sky.  Having finally freed it from the terrible Blight, Merlin and the forest girl Rhia set out to heal the land using the magical Flowering Harp.  But Fincayra remains in great danger still — and the first victim of the renewed tide of evil is Merlin's own mother.

Merlin's sole hope of saving his mother's life is to master the Seven Songs of Wizardry passed down from the greatest wizard Fincayra has ever known, Merlin's grandfather Tuatha.  Only then can he voyage to the Otherworld of the spirits and obtain the precious Elixir of Dagda.  Yet to do that he must first succeed where even Tuatha failed — by defeating Balor, the ogre whose merest glance means death.  Even more difficult, Merlin must discover the secret of seeing not with his eyes, but with his heart.

The Seven Songs 
The Seven Songs refer to the seven major arts of Wizardry.  These arts are Changing, Binding, Protecting, Naming, Leaping, Eliminating, and Seeing.  A song written on the walls inside Arbassa (Merlin's Sister's Home, an Oak Tree) by Merlin's grand father Tuatha  tells of these seven arts and it is only by finding the "Souls of the Songs" that Merlin can begin to master these arts and venture into the Otherworld to retrieve the cure for his Mother.

References

1997 American novels
1997 children's books
American children's novels
Children's fantasy novels
Works based on Merlin
Modern Arthurian fiction